Roderich von Erckert (15 December 1821 – 12 December 1900) was a German ethnographer and officer. His work on the Caucasian languages includes Der Kaukasus und seine Völker (The Caucasus and Its Peoples; 1887); Die Sprachen des kaukasischen Stammes (The Languages of the Caucasian Tribes; 1895); and Wanderungen und Siedelungen der germanischen Stämme in Mitteleuropa (Migration and Settlement of the Germanic Tribes in Central Europe; 1901).

Works
 Russland, Carte éthnografique de l’Empire de Russie (Berlin, 1862)
 Atlas ethnographique des provinces habitées en totalité ou en partie par des Polonais (St. Pétersbourg, 1863)
 Der Kaukasus und seine Völker (1887)
 Der Ursprung der Kosaken, vorzüglich  nach neuesten russischen Quellen (1882)
 Die Sprachen des kaukasischen Stammes (1895)
 Wanderungen und Siedelungen der germanischen Stämme in Mitteleuropa (1901)

1821 births
1900 deaths
German ethnographers
People from Chełmno
People from West Prussia